Taepyeong Station is a station on the Bundang Line between Gachon University and Moran Station. Located in central Seongnam, it is also in proximity of the Tancheon and Seoul Air Base.

External links
 Station information from Korail

Seoul Metropolitan Subway stations
Railway stations opened in 1994
Metro stations in Seongnam